Andrea Boragno (born 1950) is the chairman and CEO of Alcantara S.p.A.,  the Italian manufacturer of Alcantara, a covering material used in the design, fashion, consumer, automotive, aviation, marine and consumer electronics industries.  The company is noted for being Italy's first corporate entity to be certified as carbon neutral.

Education 
Boragno earned a master's degree in business administration (MBA) at Bocconi University in Milan after acquiring a bachelor's degree in chemical engineering at Genoa University.

Career 
Earlier in his career Boragno held positions at companies like Pirelli, Montedison, Himont, and Montefibre in a range of functions from marketing and sales to corporate planning, technical marketing, and finance and accounting.

In 1990, he joined Alcantara S.p.A., an Italian company belonging to Toray Industries Inc.  In 1998, he was appointed CEO of TUA Inc., a New York-based American company resulting from Toray's takeover of Springs Industries’ microfibre business.

Boragno took over as managing director of Alcantara in 2004 and has been the company's chairman since 2006. He became a senior director at Toray Industries Inc. in June 2007.  Boragno is also deputy chairman of the Fondazione Italia Giappone. (Italy-Japan Foundation).

In April 2021 Boragno has received from the Japanese Government one of the highest honors assigned to foreign citizens, the Honor of the Rising Sun, for "having contributed to raise the value of Japanese technology and industrial quality, and to promote mutual understanding between Japan and Italy".

Focus on sustainability 
Boragno is noted for initiating in 2009 Alcantara's strong commitment to sustainability.  Under Boragno's leadership, the company carried out widespread stakeholder engagement activities through the involvement of international partners such as the World Bank/Connect4Climate,  Venice International University,  and the Earth Day Network.

Boragno built on such collaborations to host periodic international symposiums designed to promote sustainability-oriented business management at the global level.
As of today, Alcantara, in partnership with the VIU (Venice International University), has organized six Symposia:
 1st edition: "Sustainability and the New Automotive Value Chain" Venice, October 2014, with the support of  Ca' Foscari University;
 2nd edition: "The Automotive Ecosystem on the Global Road to Sustainability. The Asian Perspective", Venice, October 2015, with the support of Ca' Foscari University;
 3rd edition: "Sustainability and Corporate Value", Tokyo, October 2016, in partnership with Nikkei, and the Waseda University, with the support of The Society of Global Business;
 4th edition: "Coping with Change: Global Warming and Decarbonization", Venice, March 2018;
 5th edition: "Climate How: How to Engage Society and Deploy Decarbonization", Venice, February 2019, with the support of the World Bank Group's Connect4Climate global partnership program; 
 6th edition: "Greenwashing and Sustainability: a Growing Trend that Needs To Be Addressed", Venice, October 2021, with the support of SIA (Social Impact Agenda for Italy) 

Andrea Boragno was also invited to speak about Pope Francis's encyclical Laudato Si’ to put forward Alcantara's experience as an example of a sustainable company in 2015.

Focus on art world 
Noted for connecting the brand Alcantara to the art world, around 10 years ago Boragno foresaw a great potential in such a relationship and launched a series of collaborations and projects with both established top artists and creative avant-gardes and especially with museum institutions at an international level.

The collaborations with the art world involved more than 15 museums (including MAXXI, Victoria and Albert Museum, Yuz Museum Shanghai, Mori Art Museum, Palazzo Reale ), more than 10 cities (among others Rome, London, Shanghai, Tokyo, Milan) and around 100 artists (to mention but a few: Nendo, Marcel Wanders, Ross Lovegrove, Giulio Cappellini, Nanda Vigo, Yuri Ancarani, Qin Feng, Qu Lei Lei, Chiharu Shiota, Iris Van Herpen), for a total of more than 100 artworks exhibited.

Over the years, the dialogue with creativity brought to the definition of a new form of cultural collaboration between industry and the art world. In fact the relationship purely based on patronage or fundraising objectives has been replaced by a cultural partnership relationship with international museums and institutions, where Alcantara material has become integral part of the creative process.

References 

1950 births
Living people
Italian businesspeople